Chah Qoli Di-ye Yek (also Romanized as Chāh Qolī Dī-ye Yek; also known as Chāh Qolī Dī) is a village in Golestan Rural District, in the Central District of Sirjan County, Kerman Province, Iran. At the 2006 census, its population was 23, in 7 families.

References 

Populated places in Sirjan County